Russell Targ (born April 11, 1934) is an American physicist, parapsychologist and author who is best known for his work on remote viewing.

Targ joined Stanford Research Institute (SRI) in 1972 where he and Harold E. Puthoff coined the term "remote viewing" for the practice of seeking impressions about a distant or unseen target using parapsychological means. Later, he worked with Puthoff on the US Defence Intelligence Agency's Stargate Project.

Targ's work on remote viewing has been characterized as pseudoscience and has also been criticized for lack of rigor.

Early life, education and career
Targ was born in Chicago. He is the son of William Targ, an American book editor who was well known and respected in the field of commercial publishing. According to Martin Gardner, Targ was introduced to the paranormal by his father whose Chicago bookstore carried a variety of paranormal works and whose later published works at Putnam included a biography of Helena Blavatsky, founder of the Theosophical Society, and Erich von Däniken's Chariots of the Gods.

Targ received a B.S. in physics from Queens College in 1954. From 1954 to 1956, he completed two years of graduate work in physics at Columbia University without taking a degree.

Lasers and engineering research
Russell Targ was involved in early laser research at Technical Research Group where he co-authored, with Gordon Gould among others, a 1962 paper describing the use of homodyne detection with laser light.  Later, at Sylvania Electronic Systems, he contributed to the development of frequency modulation and mode-locking of lasers, and co-authored a 1969 paper which described the operation of a kilowatt continuous wave laser.

In 1972, Targ joined the Electronics and Bioengineering Laboratory at SRI as a senior research physicist in a program founded by Harold E. Puthoff. The two conducted research into psychic abilities and their operational use for the U.S. intelligence community, including NASA, the CIA, Defense Intelligence Agency and Army Intelligence. Targ worked at SRI until 1982.

From 1986 to 1998 Targ worked in electro-optics as a senior staff scientist at the Lockheed Missiles and Space Company, where he contributed to aviation windshear sensing applications of Doppler heterodyne lidar technology.

Parapsychology research

Remote viewing 

Remote viewing (or RV) is the practice of seeking impressions about a distant or unseen target using subjective means, in particular, extra-sensory perception (ESP) or "sensing with mind". Typically a remote viewer is expected to give information about an object, event, person or location that is hidden from physical view and separated at some distance. The term was coined in the 1970s by Targ and Puthoff, while working as researchers at SRI, to differentiate it from clairvoyance.

In 1972 Puthoff and Targ tested remote viewer Ingo Swann at SRI, and the experiment led to a visit from two employees of the CIA's Directorate of Science and Technology. The result was a $50,000 CIA-sponsored project known as the Stargate Project. The SRI team published papers in Nature and Proceedings of the IEEE. They also presented their work in a symposium on consciousness at a national meeting of the American Association for the Advancement of Science.

A number of scientific reviews of the SRI (and later) experiments on remote viewing found no credible evidence that remote viewing works, and the topic of remote viewing is regarded as pseudoscience.

Reception 
The psychologists David Marks and Richard Kammann attempted to replicate Targ and Puthoff's remote viewing experiments and disputed the claims that the experiments were successful; for example, they were able to successfully identify targets from cues given by the investigators and recorded in the transcripts. They concluded: "Until remote viewing can be confirmed in conditions which prevent sensory cueing the conclusions of Targ and Puthoff remain an unsubstantiated hypothesis." The researchers said that Targ and Puthoff had not provided unpublished transcripts when requested, but that after obtaining them from a judge in the study they were able to find "a wealth of cues".

Simon Hoggart and Mike Hutchinson described Targ as willing to believe and overly credulous. A 1988 report by the United States National Research Council (NRC) concluded: "There should remain little doubt that the Targ–Puthoff studies are fatally flawed."

Remote viewing was popularized in the 1990s upon the declassification of certain documents related to the Stargate Project, a US$20 million research program that had started in 1975 and was sponsored by the U.S. government in an attempt to determine any potential military application of psychic phenomena. The program was terminated in 1995 after it failed to produce any useful intelligence information.  David Goslin, of the American Institutes for Research said: "There's no documented evidence it had any value to the intelligence community."

A variety of scientific studies of remote viewing have been conducted. Some earlier, less sophisticated experiments produced positive results, but they had invalidating flaws. None of the more recent experiments have shown positive results when conducted under properly controlled conditions. This lack of successful experiments has led the mainstream scientific community to reject remote viewing, based upon the absence of an evidence base, the lack of a theory which would explain remote viewing, and the lack of experimental techniques which can provide reliably positive results.

Science writers including Gary Bennett, Martin Gardner, Michael Shermer, and professor of neurology Terence Hines describe the topic of remote viewing as pseudoscience. According to Martin Gardner, Targ and Puthoff "imagined they could do research in parapsychology but instead dealt with 'psychics' who were cleverer than they were".

Further work on parapsychology 
The SRI remote viewing project also encompassed the work of such consulting "consciousness researchers" as the artist/writer Ingo Swann and Military Intelligence Corps chief warrant officer Joseph McMoneagle.

Targ and Puthoff both expressed the belief that Uri Geller, retired police commissioner Pat Price and artist Ingo Swann all had genuine psychic abilities; however, flaws were found with the controls in the experiments and Geller was caught using sleight of hand on many other occasions.  The SRI tests gave Geller substantial control over the procedures used to test him, with few limits on his behavior during the test.

In 1982, Targ with Keith Harary and Anthony White formed a company, Delphi Associates, to sell psychic consulting services to individuals and businesses. In the book Mind Race, Targ and Harary claimed that all nine silver futures predictions made at Delphi in 1982 were correct; however, a later attempt failed. According to Henry Gordon, "As with most psychic claims, there is little documentation to back them up." Ray Hyman has written "Targ and Harary's much-publicized case for the reality of psi and the validity of remote viewing is filled with exaggerated and unsupported conclusions. Their careless scholarship leads to new deceptions."

Personal life 
Russell was married to Joan Fischer Targ, who died in 1998. Russell and Joan had a daughter, Elisabeth Targ, who was a psychiatrist and parapsychologist and two sons Alexander and Nicholas.  In 2003 Targ married artist Patricia Kathleen Phillips.

Joan Fischer Targ was the sister of World Chess Champion Bobby Fischer.  In 2004 Targ assisted Fischer, who had been a fugitive in the United States since violating a trade embargo with his 1992 victory over Boris Spassky. While Fischer was detained in Japan with extradition pending, Targ worked to support a claim of German citizenship for Fischer.

In Pawn Sacrifice, a 2014 biopic of Fischer, Targ appears briefly, portrayed by Marco Verdoni.

Targ, who is legally blind, is an avid motorcyclist and has published a memoir on his experiences as a "blind biker".

Publications

Books authored

Books co-authored

Journal articles

On remote viewing

On precognition

On lasers and electro-optics

References

External links 
ESPResearch.com - Russell Targ's site

1934 births
American people of Russian-Jewish descent
21st-century American physicists
Columbia Graduate School of Arts and Sciences alumni
Living people
Parapsychologists
Lockheed Missiles and Space Company people